Bula Quo! is a 2013 British adventure comedy film directed by Stuart St Paul, starring Jon Lovitz, Craig Fairbrass, Laura Aikman and Status Quo musicians Francis Rossi and Rick Parfitt.

Plot
The film is set in the Pacific island country of Fiji and tells the story of rock band Status Quo becoming entangled in a local mafia operation.

Cast
 Francis Rossi as Francis
 Rick Parfitt as Rick
 Jon Lovitz as Wilson
 Craig Fairbrass as Simon
 Laura Aikman as Caroline
 Matt Kennard as Dave

Reception 
Rotten Tomatoes gave the film an aggregated score of 27%.

References

External links
 

Status Quo (band)
2013 films
British crime comedy films
Films about music and musicians
2010s crime comedy films
Films shot in Fiji
Films set in Fiji
Universal Pictures films
2013 comedy films
2010s English-language films
2010s British films